Robert MacNeil (born 1931) is a Canadian-American novelist and television news anchor and journalist.

Robert MacNeil or McNeil or McNeill or McNeal may also refer to:

Robert Duncan McNeill (born 1964), actor, producer and director
Robert H. McNeill (1917–2005), African American photographer
Bobby McNeal (1891–1956), English footballer for West Bromwich Albion and the England national team
Robert Norman McNeill, MP in the Northern Ireland parliament for Queen's University of Belfast
Robert McNeill (footballer) (1868–?), Scottish footballer for Sunderland and Greenock Morton
Bob McNeil (1891–1948), Scottish footballer for Hamilton Academical and Chelsea
Bob McNeill (born 1938), basketball player
Robert H. McNeal (1930–1988), historian and author
Robert L. McNeil Jr. (1915–2010), American chemist and pharmaceutical industry executive
Robert B. McNeill (1915–1975), Presbyterian minister

See also
J. R. McNeill (John Robert McNeill, born 1954), environmental historian
Robert McNeill Alexander (1934–2016), British zoologist